Youth Hostels Association may refer to:
YHA Australia
Youth Hostels Association (England & Wales)
Scottish Youth Hostels Association
Youth Hostels Association of India
Youth Hostel Association of New Zealand
 Hostelling International, an international federation of national youth hostel associations